The East River is a tributary of the New River,  long, in southern West Virginia and southwestern Virginia in the United States.

The East River was named for its easterly course. It rises from East River Mountain in Mercer County, West Virginia, in the eastern part of the city of Bluefield, and flows generally east-northeastward through southern Mercer County, generally in parallel to East River Mountain to its south, through the unincorporated communities of Ada, Ingleside, and Hardy; the town of Oakvale; and the unincorporated communities of Kellysville and Willowton. It flows into the New River soon after entering Virginia, in the town of Glen Lyn in Giles County.  The stream is paralleled for much of its course upstream of Oakvale by West Virginia Route 112, and downstream of Oakvale by U.S. Route 460.

See also
List of rivers of Virginia
List of rivers of West Virginia

References 

Tributaries of the New River (Kanawha River tributary)
Rivers of West Virginia
Rivers of Virginia
Rivers of Mercer County, West Virginia
Rivers of Giles County, Virginia